Alberto "Treb" Monteras II is a Filipino Film director and music video director. He is best known for his work on the film Respeto.

Monteras has amassed a large number music video credits directing music videos for Bamboo, Rivermaya, Sugarfree, Hale, Martin Nievera, Gary Valenciano and Regine Velasquez among other notable artists.

Life and career
Monteras graduated from the University of Santo Tomas with a Bachelor of Fine Arts Major in Advertising and pursued his passion for filmmaking and studied at the Mowelfund Film Institute, and at the International Institute for Film and the Arts. Later in 2016, he attended the American Society of Cinematographer’s Masterclass.

Monteras´s debut feature film Respeto, starring Abra, Dido de la Paz and Loonie, premiered at the New York Asian Film Festival. It also won the awards for best feature length film, Best Supporting Actor, Best Editing, Best Cinematography, and Best Sound at the 2017 Cinemalaya Film Festival.

Filmography 
Film

Television

Awards

References

External links
 
 

Living people
Filipino film directors
Filipino television directors
Filipino music video directors
Year of birth missing (living people)
GMA Network (company) people